George Isaac Glauberman (born 1941) is a mathematician at the University of Chicago who works on finite simple groups. He proved the ZJ theorem and the Z* theorem.

Born in New York City on March 3, 1941, Glauberman did his undergraduate studies at the Polytechnic Institute of Brooklyn, graduating in 1961, and earned a master's degree from Harvard University in 1962. He obtained his PhD degree from the University of Wisconsin–Madison in 1965, under the supervision of Richard Bruck. He has had 22 PhD students, including Ahmed Chalabi and Peter Landrock, the president and founder of Cryptomathic.  He has co-authored with J. L. Alperin, Simon P. Norton, Zvi Arad, and Justin Lynd.

In 1970 he was an invited speaker at the International Congress of Mathematicians at Nice. In 2012 he became a fellow of the American Mathematical Society.

Selected publications

See also
Glauberman normal p-complement theorem

References

External links
Home page of George Glauberman
Author profile at the Mathematical Reviews

20th-century American mathematicians
21st-century American mathematicians
Group theorists
Polytechnic Institute of New York University alumni
Harvard University alumni
University of Wisconsin–Madison alumni
University of Chicago faculty
Fellows of the American Mathematical Society
Scientists from New York City
1941 births
Living people
Mathematicians from New York (state)